Ugezu Jideofor Ugezu professional known as Ugezu J. Ugezu is a Nigerian director, actor, screenwriter and producer. Ugezu is also a Highlife composer and singer.

Early life

Ugezu was born in Enugwu Ukwu, Anambra state, Nigeria on 19 October 1970.

After he completed his primary school education, he went to Community Secondary School, Umueze Anam from 1982 to 1985 and also went to Fr. Joseph High School, Aguleri from 1986 to 1988 where he completed his secondary school education and obtained his senior school certificate.

Ugezu J. Ugezu got admission into the Enugu State University of Science and Technology popularly known as ESUT. In this institution was were he acquired bachelor's degree in Pulic Administration.

Career

Ugezu J. Ugezu has been active in the Nollywood industry since 2000 and has starred in more than 100 movies.

Ugezu writes, stars or directs movies that focused on the promotion of Igbo culture and tradition.

Filmography 

Made in Cambridge (2006)
Fools on the Run (2007)
The Gods are Wise (2008)
The Rainmakers (2009)
Jewels of the Sun (2011)
Bridge of Contract (2012)
The End is Near (2012)
Hour of Salvation (2014)
The Grave Dust (2015)
Echoes of Love (2016)
Akweke (2016)
Circle of Fire (2017)
Pretty Little Thing (2017)
Agony of a Sister (2018)
Loyal King (2020)
The Prime Minister (2022)
Princess is Mine (2022)

References 

1970 births
Living people